Muradian is a surname. Notable people with the surname include:

David Muradian (born 1982), American politician
Vago Muradian, American journalist, son of Vazgen
Vazgen Muradian (1921–2018), Armenian-American composer

See also
Muradyan